Label Bleu is a French jazz record label founded by Michel Orier.

Orier established the label in the mid-1980s in Amiens and soon after took over directorship of Amiens's cultural center, where he was able to build a recording studio. Label Bleu has concentrated on releasing jazz; in 1991, a sublabel imprint, Indigo, was founded to release world music titles.

Roster

 Abraham Inc.
 Acoustic Ladyland
 Chava Alberstein
 Antonio Agri
 Claude Barthélemy
 Stefano di Battista
 Michel Benita
 Bojan Z
 Stefano Bollani
 Safy Boutella
 Barbara Casini
 Catman
 Steve Coleman
 François Couturier
 D'Gary
 DJ Shalom
 Marc Ducret
 Elite Swingsters
 Piers Faccini
 Glenn Ferris
 Paolo Fresu
 Richard Galliano
 General Elektriks
 Inara George
 Regis Gizavo
 Bunky Green
 Andre Hodeir
 Daniel Humair
 Jaojoby
 François Jeanneau
 Wendo Kolosoy
 The Klezmatics
 Lee Konitz
 David Krakauer
 Joachim Kühn
 Eric Legnini
 Dave Liebman
 David Linx
 Julien Lourau
 Joe Lovano
 Gary Lucas
 Mahotella Queens
 Rita Marcotulli
 Carlos Maza
 Lapiro de Mbanga
 Totó la Momposina
 Juan Jose Mosalini
 Oliver Mtukudzi
 Anne-Marie Nzie
 Orchestre National de Jazz
 Jean-Marc Padovani
 Michel Portal
 Rail Band
 Enrico Rava
 Wolfgang Reisinger
 Aldo Romano
 George Russell
 Louis Sclavis
 Vincent Segal
 Andy Sheppard
 Ballake Sissoko
 Socalled
 Gianmaria Testa
 Henri Texier
 Pietro Tonolo
 Djelimady Tounkara
 Boubacar Traoré
 Rokia Traoré
 Diederik Wissels

References

French record labels
Jazz record labels